The Rio Hondo League is a high school athletic league that is part of the CIF Southern Section. Members are located in the Pasadena area in the west San Gabriel Valley region of Los Angeles County.

Members
 Blair International Baccalaureate School
 La Cañada High School
 Monrovia High School 
 San Marino High School 
 South Pasadena High School
 Temple City High School

References

CIF Southern Section leagues